Deafness in France is a topic that is relevant to individuality, education, and community. France has a long-running history of involvement with DHH (Deaf or Hard of Hearing) individuals, especially during World War II. There were reportedly about 6,000,00 hearing impaired adults in France (11.5% of the adult population) as of 2011 and, while FSL (French Sign Language) is the main signed language in France, ASL (American Sign Language) is studied and used commonly, and French Cued Speech, a mixture of spoken French and FSL, is also not uncommon.

Culture 
DHH individuals in France may take steps in early and mid-life to be integrated into hearing society. One of the most common practices are cochlear implants, which are devices that are affixed to the structures of the ear in charge of hearing, storing and subsequently transmitting sounds to the auditory nerve. This allows certain damages in the flow of hearing to be bypassed. Many children who are born in France are actually screened for deafness within the first week of their lives, and many doctors will immediately launch into the process of implementing a cochlear implant if deafness is found to be the case. There are many controversies surrounding this topic, and a great deal of parents, both hearing and non-hearing, agree that this may be too early. While France is ahead of many other regions across the world and known as one of the earliest identifiers of DHH children, many say that these steps are taken too early, and that these processes may alienate the children. Such topics are of active debate. A similar topic of alienation, speech therapy is commonplace, in which DHH individuals are trained to speak and use their voice. This gives a strong sense of abnormality to many involved, but it is carried out because it does help ease of function for many DHH individuals outside of DHH communities, or in predominantly non-signing communities.

There are also some communities and structures in place to prevent the alienation of DHH individuals and move more toward celebrating it. Small communities of DHH individuals are informally but frequently formed, close-knit circles drawn together in which things like cochlear implants and speech therapy is not needed. There are also many associations that represent the concerns and needs of DHH individuals, and many that celebrate them. To name a few, performances and classes at the IVT theater that bring DHH people together in a creative and educational manner, the political endeavors of FNSF to make the needs of DHH individuals more heard and met, and the bi-yearly Festival Clin d'Oeil. This festival is a celebration of arts, parties, movies, and conversation, entirely signed and geared toward DHH individuals. All of these instances help form a community around deafness, and there are many who shy away from the societally-enforced conformist practices in favor of this independent community and its various subsets across the DHH spectrum.

Education 
Since 1989, laws in France have standardized a secondary language in primary education to pair with French. This is a massive obstacle for DHH students, as neither their primary or secondary languages are permitted to be a sign language of any sort, as is proper with similar policies in other countries. Another law was passed in 2005, however, that was geared as an equal rights policy, but under its purview was the integration of DHH students into mainstream school, losing a good deal of the support that was available to them. This leaves many DHH students in environments where the staff is simply not trained or funded sufficiently to teach them effectively, and these students who find themselves in this situation tend to fall behind; 99.6% DHH students take English as their first foreign language, and the majority who learn a second foreign language generally choose French Sign Language, as it is the earliest time that they can take the language native to them. This all adds up to show that DHH students essentially have to take two foreign language classes before they can take their native language, and we see many who withdraw from their secondary language courses and put themselves behind academically simply to master French, a strategy popularized by a 2003 study by Ivani Fuselier‐Souza. There is also a technique known as French cued speech, also known as signed French, which is a mixture of FSL and spoken French which is mean to teach classes of hearing and non-hearing students simultaneously, but it takes training to execute, and thus is also limited by the aforementioned lack of training and/or funding

There are certainly schools geared specifically toward DHH students, but not all DHH children have the opportunity to participate, so there are many language-deficient DHH individuals who have gone through their education as normal and simply not been given the tools to succeed. A study published in 2020 by Daniel Daigle, Rachel Berthiaume, Agnès Costerg and Anne Plisson on the spelling errors of DHH French students showed that while the number of spelling errors did not vary much, the severity of each spelling error ran much deeper due to more fundamental misunderstandings of their language, and as a result was significantly harder to read or understand.

History 
In 1755, a French priest by the name of Abbe Charles-Michel de L'Épée opened a school for the deaf upon his own funding, a school that produced what is generally thought of as the first completed sign language with direct routes to a modern sign language. Since then, FSL has been one of the forerunning sign languages in the world, with a great deal of historical significance put behind it. It was around this time as well that the way in which DHH individuals were looked after was changed; with the advent of sign language, those who cared for DHH people shifted primarily from educators toward doctors. With new forms of communication, many diseases and injuries began to be found quickly that were much harder to diagnose before. The split of care between doctors and educators has leveled out over time to be a bit more even, but there are still issues with the rate of identification of deadly diseases and infections, particularly cancer, with the average stage of identification being roughly a full stage later than normal identifications.

A particularly tense time in deaf history was during World War II, during which many deaf people were killed as a way of culling the population under Nazi orders. France was one of the places that these cruel practices made their way to and, while no specific numbers are historically available, the effect felt was not insignificant. There were also conflicts in France itself, where many deaf people who applied to work in factories to aid the war effort, but were turned away for unlawful reasons. In the wake of this, letters were written and published in popular newspapers like the Gazette, and policies that made it illegal to turn away deaf workers were put into place, but the policies only affected French males who were deaf due to other policies in place. In 1942, the French prime minister Pierre Laval Germany of prisoner to worker exchange. For every three French workers that he sent to Germany, a prisoner of war would be freed and released back to France. Primarily deaf workers were sent, however, and many ended up becoming prisoners of war themselves, mainly those who could not learn quickly to interpret spoken German, which were the majority. Perhaps as a result of the active ways that DHH individuals made themselves prevalent and heard in wartime France, more deaf characters began to appear in French media, ultimately leading to a flourishing of deaf arts, as well as the fight for individuality.

Organizations

FNSF 
The FNSF (National Federation of Deafness in France) is a federation involved in 89 different organizations, comprising a wide array of topics in which the stances of the DHH community are underrepresented. This federation tries to make the rights and views of DHH individuals in France more considered, and even helps oversee some legal processes. This federation is involved in meetings with the Ministries of National Education, Social Affairs, the National Consultative Committee for People with Disabilities, the High Authority of Health, the National Institute of Prevention for Education and Health, the National Monuments Center, and the Superior Audiovisual Council, just to name a few. The predominant values of the federation are culture, unity, participation, self-representation, consistency, patrimony and solidarity. These are the values that are upheld in its decisions, and they are also the values placed in the center of education in the camps that it hosts across Europe to facilitate education of FSL in underprivileged DHH children. It is a member of the European Union of the Deaf and the World Federation of the Deaf.

IVT 
IVT (International Visual Theater) is an organization based in Paris, where they have been stationed since 1981. The operation is run by Emmanuelle Laborit and Jennifer Lesage-David, who use the theater as an educational and community-building center for individuals in the DHH community. Many come to the theater to take classes, participate in performances, and be in a setting where FSL is the standard. Dozens of shows are run each year, and hundreds of individuals attend classes across the same course of time. Classes regarding language, culture, various arts and more are held within the building, but also online, as the theater contributes as broadly as it can to the educational facilitation of DHH people in France.

Deafi 
 DEAFI, founded in 2009, is a French communication organization that helps the state of the deaf community by improving the state of communication. To make education and communication broader, the company specializes in communication and connections, known for the webcams especially that aid in the remote use of FSL. The company assists in online communication, especially during the COVID-19 outbreak, but its overall goal is to give its clients the tools to move away from it and achieve independence. The company specializes further in connecting its clients with specialized education and job opportunities, as such things can better facilitate independence for the future.

References 

Disability in France
France
Deaf culture in France